Yuly Mikhailovich Shokalsky (October 17, 1856 in Saint Petersburg – March 26, 1940 in Leningrad) was a Russian oceanographer, cartographer, and geographer.

Career
A grandson of Anna Kern, Pushkin's celebrated mistress,  Shokalsky graduated from the Naval Academy in 1880 and made a career in the Imperial Russian Navy, helping establish the Sevastopol Marine Observatory and rising to the rank of Lieutenant-General in 1912. At the same time, he developed interest in limnology and meteorology and became the most prolific Russian author on the subjects. In the Marine Miscellanies alone, he published some 300 articles. 

Shokalsky's most important monograph was Oceanography (1917), a collection of his lectures which examined connection between meteorology and hydrology and emphasized the importance of monitoring marine phenomena in order to understand global changes of climate. Shokalsky insisted on differentiating oceanography and hydrography and coined the term "World Ocean".

In 1904, Shokalsky was elected into the Royal Geographical Society. Ten years later, he was put in charge of the Russian Geographical Society and retained the post until 1931.

Honours
His name was given to the Shokalsky Strait connecting the Laptev Sea and the Kara Sea, to the large Shokalsky Island in the Kara Sea, and to the ship Akademik Shokalskiy.

See also
Aleksey Tillo

External links
 Biography

1856 births
1940 deaths
Scientists from Saint Petersburg
Russian oceanographers
Russian hydrographers
Cartographers from the Russian Empire
Geographers from the Russian Empire
Soviet geographers
Explorers from the Russian Empire
Members of the French Academy of Sciences
Corresponding Members of the Russian Academy of Sciences (1917–1925)
Corresponding Members of the USSR Academy of Sciences
Honorary Members of the USSR Academy of Sciences
Imperial Russian Navy personnel
Fellows of the Royal Geographical Society
Soviet oceanographers
Soviet hydrographers